The Pennsylvania Game Commission (PGC) is the state agency responsible for wildlife conservation and management in Pennsylvania in the United States. It was originally founded  years ago and currently utilizes more than 700 full-time employees and thousands of part-time and volunteers in its official mission to "manage and protect wildlife and their habitats while promoting hunting and trapping for current and future generations."

History
In the late 1800s as a result of deforestation, pollution and unregulated hunting/trapping, wildlife decreased in population and diversity. The wildlife, then-commonly referred to as "game," was to be protected by establishing the Game Commission in 1895 by state Legislature. It was—and still is—funded primarily through the sale of licenses, State Game Land natural resource revenue, and a federal excise tax on guns and ammunition.

Game Wardens

The main workforce of the Pennsylvania Game Commission are Game Wardens, formerly known as Wildlife Conservation Officers (and originally Game Protectors). 
 
Game Wardens serve as sworn law enforcement officers for wildlife crimes, enforcing the hunting/trapping and conservation laws. They patrol the Pennsylvania State Game Lands and teach hunter-trapper education courses as well as providing many other educational opportunities for the Pennsylvania public, including wildlife programs for schools and community organizations.

Initial training for Game Wardens occurs at the Ross Leffler School of Conservation in Harrisburg. New recruiting classes are formed when positions open up, which is normally every 2nd or 3rd year. Classes are usually kept below 30 students. Training is an 11-month program in Law Enforcement, Natural Resource Management, Wildlife Management, and other subjects.

Deputy Game Wardens are part-time, whereas State Game Wardens are full-time, career-oriented positions. Serving as a Deputy does not lead to promotion into a State Game Warden position. Deputies do not receive regular salary or wages, however, they may receive limited compensation for certain duties. function in all phases of activity Game Commission activities and assume the powers as authorized by the Game and Wildlife Code, subject to limitations established by Commission regulations and operating procedures.

Deputies are commonly involved in: law enforcement patrols and investigations, answering complaints and calls for service, nuisance wildlife control, hunter-trapper education classes, educational programs, and assisting other agencies.

Fallen wardens 

Since the establishment of the Pennsylvania Game Commission, eleven Game Wardens have died while on duty.

Official game publications

Pennsylvania Game News is the PGC's monthly publication, dealing with wildlife conservation and the financial and legislative functions of the Game Commission.
Monthly Field Notes is written by Game Wardens and their Deputies, which are comedic stories about happenings in the fields. They are a well received feature of the publication.
Hunting & Trapping Digest is a complimentary publication received by those who purchase hunting or trapping licenses for the respective year.

See also
List of law enforcement agencies in Pennsylvania
Pennsylvania Fish and Boat Commission
List of State Fish and Wildlife Management Agencies in the U.S.

Notes

References

External links
 Pennsylvania Game Commission Official Website

Government of Pennsylvania
State law enforcement agencies of Pennsylvania
State agencies of Pennsylvania
State wildlife and natural resource agencies of the United States